Ronglan is a village in the municipality of Levanger in Trøndelag county, Norway.  It is located southwest of the village of Skogn and southeast of the village of Ekne. The European route E6 highway goes through the village.  The Nordlandsbanen railway line runs through the village, stopping at Ronglan Station.

References

External links
Ronglan IL

Ronglan Samfunnshus

Villages in Trøndelag
Levanger